Lampromicra is a genus of true bugs in the family Scutelleridae. They are commonly referred to as jewel bugs or metallic shield bugs.

Distribution
Lampromicra have been recorded in parts of Australia (Queensland, New South Wales, Northern Territory, Western Australia), Papua New Guinea, Indonesia, New Caledonia, Philippines, Moluccas, Solomon Islands.

Species
 Lampromicra aerea (Distant, 1892)
 Lampromicra balteata (Walker, 1867)
 Lampromicra cuprina (Stål, 1873)
 Lampromicra distinguenda (Walker, 1868)
 Lampromicra ditissima (Vollenhoven, 1863)
 Lampromicra dohertyi (Distant, 1903)
 Lampromicra elegans (Montrouzier, 1861)
 Lampromicra erythrina (Walker, 1867)
 Lampromicra fastuosa (Vollenhoven, 1863)
 Lampromicra femorata (Walker, 1867)
 Lampromicra festiva (Germar, 1839)
 Lampromicra fulgurans (Stål, 1873)
 Lampromicra geniculata (Stål, 1871)
 Lampromicra insignis (Schouteden, 1904)
 Lampromicra jactator (Stål, 1854)
 Lampromicra leucocyanea (Montrouzier, 1855)
 Lampromicra regia (Bergroth, 1895)
 Lampromicra senator (Fabricius, 1803)
 Lampromicra subapicalis (Walker, 1867)
 Lampromicra vulcanica (Le Guillou, 1841)
 Lampromicra woodfordi (Distant, 1899)

References

Scutelleridae
Pentatomomorpha genera